Bishop Grosseteste University (BGU) is one of two public universities in the city of Lincoln, England (the other being the University of Lincoln). BGU was established as a teacher training college for the Diocese of Lincoln in 1862. It gained taught degree awarding powers in 2012, applied for full university status, and was granted on 3 December 2012. It has around 2,300 full-time students enrolled on a variety of programmes and courses.

History

Lincoln Diocesan Training School for Mistresses was founded in 1862. It occupied the premises of an earlier, unsuccessful training establishment for male teachers, which had been built in 1842 with a chapel, lecture rooms and a school for teaching practice. It was later renamed Lincoln Diocesan Training College and, to mark the centenary in 1962, was renamed Bishop Grosseteste College.

The college took its name from Robert Grosseteste, a 13th-century statesman, scholastic philosopher, theologian, scientist and Bishop of Lincoln. The college began awarding degrees of Bachelor of Education (BEd), originally validated by the University of Nottingham. From 1987, degrees were validated by the University of Hull and BEd students spent one of the four years of their course reading their main subject at Hull. In 1991, the college stopped awarding BEd degrees and began instead to award the degree of Bachelor of Arts with Honours and Qualified Teacher Status (BA(Hons)QTS). In 2003, a Validation Agreement was signed with the University of Leicester.

In 2006, the college was awarded university college status. In 2008, Dame Judith Mayhew Jonas was named Chancellor of Bishop Grosseteste University College. 2012 saw a change in legislation regarding the use of the title university, allowing higher education establishments with more than 1,000 students to apply for university status. BGUC applied for the University title in June 2012 and was renamed Bishop Grosseteste University in December 2013.

Campus

The university is on a single-site campus in uphill Lincoln, a short walk from the historic Bailgate area, the Cathedral and Castle. The oldest buildings are on the Newport frontage, with the earliest, a building of 1841, in a Tudor revival (or "Tudorbethan") style. It is in brick with stone dressings and has gabled dormers. In 1861 an extension range, in a similar but plainer style, was placed at right angles away from the road. In 1862, Sir Arthur Blomfield designed the simple and plainer chapel, which stands between these buildings and the road. In recent years the campus has seen many new developments and new facilities.

An extension to the Sibthorp Library (the Cornerstone Building) was completed in 2012 and officially opened by Anne, Princess Royal in 2013. The development doubled study space available to students and incorporated Student Support services within the same building. It also provided dedicated space for two unique library collections: the Teaching Resources Collection and the Lincolnshire Collection. The Library's Lincolnshire Collection was greatly augmented in 2014 with books donated by the Society for Lincolnshire History and Archaeology.

In 2012 the on-campus Bishop Greaves Theatre was upgraded with state-of-the-art cinema equipment and became The Venue. It holds regular screenings of both popular Hollywood releases and more obscure independent films, and is also home to the Lincoln Film Society. The Venue is also in use as a theatre, particularly by the university's drama students and its own BG Touring Ltd.

In 2013 the main entrance to the campus was moved from Newport to Longdales Road and, as a result, the main reception was relocated to the Robert Hardy Building. The space previously occupied by main reception was upgraded to a quiet study area for students and the previous external entrance was locked.

Extensive development work took place on the university campus during 2013, refurbishing existing accommodation and providing a new £4.3m hall of residence. A new dining facility was completed in 2013. Development of Constance Stewart Hall during 20162017 added teaching rooms in an extension designed by LK2 Architects.

Student accommodation

There are 218 places in the on-campus halls of residence and an additional 78 in the off-campus hall of residence, Crosstrend House. The on-campus halls of residence are available to first years and those with disabilities. Some second or third years live in halls as Senior Residents, providing guidance and a 24/7 on-call service to the first-year residents. All accommodation benefits from free wi-fi access, which is also available throughout the campus.

Extensive work to the on-campus accommodation was carried out during 2013. Constance Stewart Hall (CSH), erected in the 1950s, was renovated and upgraded to provide self-catering accommodation and improved facilities for students. The existing Wickham Hall and Nelson Hall accommodation blocks were demolished. Wickham Hall was replaced with a larger accommodation building of the same name, and Nelson Hall was replaced with a new dining facility. Crosstrend House, situated a short walk from the university campus, was open to new students from September 2012 in a building that formerly housed the Crown Prosecution Service. As there is a high proportion of mature students and local students, few first years need to live in; most tend to board in private homes.

Statistics

Academic profile

Bishop Grosseteste University offers foundation and honours degrees at undergraduate and postgraduate level.  This includes multiple routes into teaching such as BA, BSc and Postgraduate Certificate in Education (PGCE). As well as joint honours options, many subjects can be studied as major/minor combinations. Teaching is through lectures, seminars, workshops, practicals and work-related placements. The university awards foundation degrees in education, childhood and youthwork, BA degrees in 17 subjects, including primary education, SEN and early childhood studies, and BSc degrees in 4 subjects. As well as degrees with QTS, the university awards PGCEs, MA degrees in 8 subjects and doctorates. Doctoral study (conducted in partnership with the University of Leicester) leads to either a PhD or an EdD.

The university is engaged with an Initial Teacher Education partnership with New College Stamford and Lincoln College, in which students are trained to teach whilst teaching in the maintained sector. The provision was branded Good by Ofsted in all four judgements (Overall effectiveness; Outcomes for trainees; Quality of training; Quality of leadership and management.)

As part of its five-year growth plan, BGU set out a number of interrelated ambitions in 2014. These include expanding its student base to around 4,500 students by 2019; developing its portfolio of undergraduate and postgraduate degree programmes (including the introduction of archaeology, business (team entrepreneurship), counselling, health and social care, psychology and sociology BA or BSc degrees), and widening access to its courses locally, nationally and internationally.

Student life

The University has an active Students' Union, commonly referred to as BGSU. There are two full-time sabbatical officers, a CEO, a part-time volunteer team of 15 students and 6 support staff focused on administration and communications. They provide academic and pastoral support, entertainment and activities throughout the year. A key function of the union is to provide representational services to the students of BGU with a Course Reps scheme, in which there is a representative from each course who provides feedback and shapes the development of the course structure.

Bishop Grosseteste Students' Union represents the students in the British Universities and Colleges Sport leagues, as well as offering training for participation. All the current sport clubs compete in their respective BUCS leagues. The netball team has won successive promotions since its inauguration, while the rugby union and badminton teams made their débuts in the 201213 season. The university has a sport and fitness centre, consisting of a non-standard dimension sports hall, a gym with cardio and resistance machines as well as a weights area, and a field with two football pitches.

In 2019 the university ranked 1st in the UK for acceptance rates on a University review platform StudentCrowd.

Notable people

Notable alumni

 David Pugh: West End theatre producer
 Jade Etherington: Paralympic ski silver medallist

Notable academics

 Muriel Robinson, Principal 2003–2012, Vice-Chancellor 2012–2013

See also 
 Armorial of UK universities
 College of Education
 List of universities in the UK

References

Further reading

 Zebedee, D. H. J. (1962). Lincoln Diocesan Training College 1862–1962. Lincoln: Lincoln Diocesan Training College.

External links

 Bishop Grosseteste University
 Bishop Grosseteste University Students' Union

 
1862 establishments in England
Educational institutions established in 1862
Universities UK